Mars Ravelo's Darna is a Philippine superhero series airing on Kapamilya Channel. It aired on the network's Primetime Bida evening block, A2Z, TV5's Todo Max Primetime Singko and worldwide on The Filipino Channel from August 15, 2022 to February 10, 2023, replacing FPJ's Ang Probinsyano.

Aside from its limited television telecast, the series is also available for streaming on YouTube for limited periods.

Series overview

Episodes

Season 1

Season 2

Notes

References 

Darna
Darna